American Boy & Girl is an album by Garland Jeffreys, released on A&M Records in 1979. 

The album peaked at No. 151 on the Billboard 200. "Matador" became a hit in Germany, reaching number 2 on the singles chart. It was also a top ten hit in Austria, Holland, Belgium, Switzerland, and France.

Critical reception
The New York Times wrote that the album "projects a humanism that's affecting for its steadfast refusal to be fashionable."

Track listing
All tracks composed by Garland Jeffreys
 "Livin' For Me" - 4:19
 "Bad Dream" - 2:44
 "City Kids" - 5:12
 "American Boy & Girl" - 3:52
 "Matador" - 4:38
 "Night of Living Dead" - 4:43
 "Bring Back the Love" - 3:28
 "Ship of Fools" - 3:00
 "Shoot the Moonlight Out" - 3:23
 "If Mao Could See Me Now" - 5:09

Personnel 
Garland Jeffreys - vocals, guitar, percussion
The Mao Band
Alan Freedman - acoustic guitar, arrangements
Rafael Goldfield - bass
Tim Cappello - keyboards, tenor & soprano saxophone, backing vocals
Anton Fig - drums, percussion
with:
Herb Alpert - "drunken" trumpet
Robert Athas - bass, guitars
Rory Dodd - harmony vocals
Paul Prestopino - mandolin
Eric Troyer - vocals
Ed Freeman - conductor
Technical
Terri Kaplan - production coordinator 
Roy Cicala, Sam Ginsberg - engineer
Carole Langer - design, cover concept
Lou Lanzano - cover photography

References

1979 albums
Garland Jeffreys albums
A&M Records albums
Albums recorded at Record Plant (New York City)